Sedition Act may refer to:

Alien and Sedition Acts, including the Sedition Act of 1798, laws passed by the United States Congress
Sedition Act 1661, an English statute that largely relates to treason
Sedition Act of 1918, also passed by the United States Congress
Sedition Act 1948, a law in Malaysia
Sedition Act (Singapore), a law in Singapore

See also
 List of short titles